The municipal elections of Bosnia and Herzegovina in 1990 were won by several parties. In most municipalities they organized governments in coalitions, or independently if they had a large majority.

In most municipalities with either a relative or absolute Bosniak majority, Party of Democratic Action (SDA) won a majority of the vote and the right to choose the mayor.

In most municipalities with either a relative or absolute Serbian majority, Serbian Democratic Party (SDS) won a majority of the vote and the right to choose the mayor. SDS also won elections in Doboj and Vogošća (a Bosniak relative majority).

In most municipalities with either a relative or absolute Croatian majority, Croatian Democratic Union of Bosnia and Herzegovina (HDZ) won a majority of the vote and the right to choose the mayor. Only in Vareš—a municipality with a relative Croatian majority—did HDZ not win a majority of votes. HDZ also won elections in Bugojno, Fojnica, Jajce, Žepče, Stolac and Mostar (a Bosniak relative majority) and Modriča and Derventa and Kotor Varoš (a Serbian relative majority).

Nationally, Fikret Abdić gained the most votes to become President. He never assumed the presidency however, leaving it to Alija Izetbegović.

Results by municipality:

Nationalistic parties did not win only in Tuzla, Vareš and Novo Sarajevo

References

External links
 Election in Vitez
 Election in Busovaca
 Election in Bugojno
 Election in Mostar
 Election in Novi Travnik
 Election in Ljubuški, Čapljina and Kiseljak
 Election in Konjic
 Elections in Gornji Vakuf-Uskoplje
 Election in Konjic
 Election in Kakanj
 Election in Bosanski Šamac
 Election in Odžak, Modriča, Sarajevo, Maglaj,Goražde, ...
 Election in Prijedor
 Election in Prnjavor
 References to elections in Derventa
 References to elections in Bosanski Brod
 References to elections in Orašje
 References to elections in Jablanica
 References to elections in Kreševo
 References to elections in Banja Luka, Zenica and Bihać
References to elections in Travnik References to elections in Travnik References to elections in Travnik
References to elections in Ključ
 Overall results of elections 

Municipal elections in Bosnia and Herzegovina
Elections in Bosnia and Herzegovina
Bosnia
Municipal